A Wilhelm Scream, released on November 20, 2009 through Paper + Plastick, is the second EP and in all the fifth release from the Massachusetts-based melodic hardcore band A Wilhelm Scream since changing their name from Smackin' Isaiah in 2002. It is the follow-up to their critically acclaimed third full-length album Career Suicide and has thus far received very favourable reviews.

The EP marked the debut of guitarist Mike Supina, who replaced longtime member Chris Levesque and took over lead guitar duties from Trevor Reilly (though Reilly continues to play all leads and solos on songs written before the EP).

Recording and composition
It was revealed in a July 2009 press release, featuring a partial interview with bassist Brian Robinson, that the band recorded this project themselves and it was therefore produced and recorded at their very own Black & Blue Studios in New Bedford, Massachusetts. "The reason for this long break from touring is because we took a crack at recording ourselves", is what Robinson informed. "This five song EP is an eclectic mix of all the avenues the band have gone down since Mute Print–and we’ll be throwing them into the sets on these upcoming tours", Robinson continued.

In an interview featured in an article published on Revolver's website, Reilly explained the lyrical meaning behind a song from the EP; "Bulletproof Tiger":
"The song was originally inspired by an incident that occurred in my neighborhood years back when a teenage boy murdered his mom in the middle of the afternoon with a kitchen knife. As I was writing and researching, it morphed into a story about a family member fighting his demons and drug addiction, told from his perspective with hopefully a look up to the future with determined eyes".
In collaboration with A Wilhelm Scream and Paper + Plastick, the magazine exclusively pre-released the mentioned song in the same article as mentioned earlier.

Release
This is the band's first release since their signing with Paper + Plastick in June, 2009. They departed with Nitro Records in relation to its slowly progressing demise and the bands contract with the label being fulfilled. The original intent was to release the EP in Paper + Plastick's typical fashion, only making it available for sale as a 12" vinyl with a die cut gatefold jacket and digital download through the label's website. However, on its release date it was made available digitally and for physical sale as a tour edition digipak CD, not as a vinyl. Paper + Plastick has later stated that a 12" vinyl version, featuring three additional tracks, will be released early in the new year.

In August and September 2009, they went on a European tour, which included an appearance the Reading and Leeds Festivals. Following this, they toured the US until October 2009, leading up to a performance at The Fest On November 10, 2009, Punknews.org announced that the EP was available for tease preview streaming and purchase through the iTunes Store, ten days before its original release date.

The release is known to have been released by Shock Entertainment in Australia and Playfalse Records in Greece, both in conjunction with Paper + Plastick. Shock Records, A Wilhelm Scream's Australian label, released the EP on CD in a digipak on November 20, the same date is the EP released in the United States. The Australian edition features an additional bonus track; a cover of The Outfield's "Your Love". A music video was released for "Fun Time" on December 18, 2009. On January 7, 2010, the band performed "Skid Rock" on the TV show Talk Show Night at Juicebox Manor. In March 2010, they appeared at Harvest of Hope Fest and went on a short Canadian tour with Outbreak. The following month, A Wilhelm Scream performed at the Groezrock festival in Belgium and then embarked on a European tour with Pennywise and Strike Anywhere. A music video was released for "Australias" on July 6, 2010. They went on a cross-country Canadian tour throughout September 2010; a majority of the shows featured Comeback Kid and Madball.

Track listing

Personnel

A Wilhelm Scream
 Nuno Pereira – vocals, production, recording
 Trevor Reilly – guitar, backing vocals, production, recording, engineering
 Mike Supina – lead guitar, production, recording, engineering
 Brian J. Robinson – bass, backing vocals, production, recording
 Nicholas Pasquale Angelini – drums, production, recording

Studio personnel
 James Whitten – engineering
 Matt Bayles – mixing
 Nick Zampiello – mastering

Additional personnel
 Derek Deal – artwork and illustrations

Release history

Details
 Recording studio: Black & Blue, New Bedford, Massachusetts
 Mastering studio: New Alliance East, Cambridge, Massachusetts

References

External links
 A Wilhelm Scream PureVolume
 A Wilhelm Scream Last.fm
 Paper + Plastick Website
 Matt Bayles Website
 Derek Deal Website

A Wilhelm Scream albums
2009 EPs